George Howard Shaw (July 25, 1933 – January 3, 1998) was an American football quarterback who played seven seasons in the National Football League (NFL).

Early life
A native Oregonian, Shaw quarterbacked Grant High School in Portland, Oregon, to two state football championships before enrolling at the University of Oregon, where he was a first-team All-American in both football and baseball.

Professional career
He was selected by the Baltimore Colts as the first player in the 1955 NFL Draft.  Shaw quickly became the starter, but on October 21, 1956 in a game against the Chicago Bears in Chicago that the Bears won 58 to 27, he suffered a broken leg and was replaced by rookie backup Johnny Unitas.  As Unitas embarked on his legendary career, Shaw lasted two more years in Baltimore as the backup before being traded to the New York Giants, where he played two seasons.  Shaw played one season with the Minnesota Vikings, where he started the first game in franchise history but was replaced in the first half by rookie backup Fran Tarkenton who took over the starting job.  He also played one season with the Denver Broncos of the American Football League before retiring from football in 1962.

Art Donovan, his Hall of Fame teammate on the Colts, had this to say about him: "In 1955, we had George Shaw at quarterback.  George wasn't a big guy, but he was talented, a lot like Francis Tarkenton.  We were playing the Bears out in Chicago, and Shaw took a mighty rap as he dropped back to pass.  Ed Sprinkle, a grizzly old defensive end who had come into the league in 1944 out of Hardin-Simmons, broke through and hit Shaw low.  Sprinkle kind of had him around the knees and was holding him up.  No in-the-grasp rules in those days, although George sure could have used a rule like that right about then.  Because as Sprinkle was keeping him upright, linebacker George Connor got about a fifteen-yard head of steam up and bulled through and hit George high, right in the mouth.  I mean put a shoulder right in his face and leveled him.  Connor broke Shaw's face mask, broke his nose, and knocked his teeth out.  George was a mess.  They dragged him off the field, and his nose was spurting blood, and he didn't know where he was when he got to the bench... When George finally regained his senses, he said to Dick Szymanski, 'Hey Syzzie, how do my teeth look?'  And Syzzie said, 'I don't know, George.  They aren't there.'  And you know what?  George Shaw went back into that game.  There was at least one fat defensive tackle on the Baltimore sidelines that gained a lot of respect for him that day."

Death
Shaw died at his home in Portland after a long illness at the age of 64.

See also

 List of NCAA major college football yearly total offense leaders
History of the New York Giants (1925-1978)
Other American Football League players

References

External links

1933 births
1998 deaths
Players of American football from Portland, Oregon
American football quarterbacks
Grant High School (Portland, Oregon) alumni
Oregon Ducks football players
National Football League first-overall draft picks
Baltimore Colts players
New York Giants players
Minnesota Vikings players
Denver Broncos (AFL) players
Burials at Mount Calvary Cemetery (Portland, Oregon)
Oregon Ducks baseball players